Coleridge is a village in Cedar County, Nebraska, United States.  The population was 537 at the 2020 census.

History
Coleridge was platted in 1883 when the railroad was extended to that point. It was named for Lord John Coleridge, the Lord Chief Justice of England, who was then paying a visit to the United States.

Mr. Norris and the Chicago, St. Paul, Minneapolis & Omaha Railway failed to reach agreement for a right of way through his town of Norris in 1883. Thus, the railroad was built two miles west of Norris, and lots began selling in what would become the town of Coleridge, approximately three miles west and one mile north of Norris. By early 1885, many of Norris’ businesses had moved to Coleridge. A Cedar County Plat Map (2) showed Norris still having 16 lots at its original location in 1899. The Norris School (District 30), organized March 16, 1880, was dissolved and merged with Coleridge District 41 in 1959. The Norris Cemetery is located outside of Coleridge, one mile east and ¾ mile north of the former city of Norris.

During the late afternoon on June 17, 2014, a massive EF3 tornado clipped the edge of town. A scoreboard and bleachers were swept away, and trees and power lines were blown down. No casualties were reported.

Geography
Coleridge is located at  (42.505675, −97.204419).

Demographics

2010 census
As of the census of 2010, there were 473 people, 224 households, and 120 families residing in the village. The racial makeup of the village was 99.2% White, 0.2% Native American, and 0.6% from two or more races.

There were 224 households, of which 19.2% had children under the age of 18 living with them, 46.9% were married couples living together, 4.0% had a female householder with no husband present, 2.7% had a male householder with no wife present, and 46.4% were non-families. 43.3% of all households were made up of individuals, and 28.2% had someone living alone who was 65 years of age or older. The average household size was 2.01 and the average family size was 2.82.

The median age in the village was 53.3 years. 18% of residents were under the age of 18; 5.9% were between the ages of 18 and 24; 12.9% were from 25 to 44; 31.3% were from 45 to 64; and 31.9% were 65 years of age or older. The gender makeup of the village was 45.9% male and 54.1% female.

2000 census
As of the census of 2000, there were 541 people, 242 households, and 128 families residing in the village. The population density was 1,091.7 people per square mile (417.8/km). There were 267 housing units at an average density of 538.8/sq mi (206.2/km). The racial makeup of the village was 98.52% White, 0.18% from other races, and 1.29% from two or more races. Hispanic or Latino of any race were 0.37% of the population.

There were 242 households, out of which 20.2% had children under the age of 18 living with them, 48.3% were married couples living together, 3.7% had a female householder with no husband present, and 46.7% were non-families. 45.0% of all households were made up of individuals, and 28.9% had someone living alone who was 65 years of age or older. The average household size was 2.04 and the average family size was 2.91.

In the village, the population was spread out, with 19.0% under the age of 18, 5.7% from 18 to 24, 18.5% from 25 to 44, 22.2% from 45 to 64, and 34.6% who were 65 years of age or older. The median age was 50 years. For every 100 females, there were 87.2 males. For every 100 females age 18 and over, there were 82.5 males.

The median income for a household in the village was $28,365, and the median income for a family was $41,250. Males had a median income of $25,903 versus $15,714 for females. The per capita income for the village was $15,656. About 6.0% of families and 10.4% of the population were below the poverty line, including 13.1% of those under age 18 and 16.1% of those age 65 or over.

Notable people

 William Joseph Dendinger (b. 1939), Roman Catholic prelate
 Vernon Simeon Plemion Grant (1902–90), illustrator
 George Stone (1876–1945), Major League Baseball left fielder who was the 1906 AL batting champion

References

External links
 Village of Coleridge

Villages in Cedar County, Nebraska
Villages in Nebraska